All My Life: Their Greatest Hits is the greatest hits album (eighth overall) released by K-Ci & JoJo. It contains all of their singles as a duo as well as favorites from their four albums.

Track listing 
Last Night's Letter
You Bring Me Up
How Could You
All My Life 1998
Don't Rush (Take Love Slowly) 1998
If You Think You're Lonely Now (K-Ci)
I Care About You (with Babyface, Kevon Edmonds, Melvin Edmonds)
Never Say Never Again
Through Heaven's Eyes
Life
Tell Me It's Real
Girl
Crazy (Alternate Version)
Wanna Do You Right
I Can't Find the Words
This Very Moment
Special
Down for Life

Personnel 
Credits for All My Life: Their Greatest Hits adapted from AllMusic.

* Darrell "Delite" Allamby – Composer, producer
 Kwaku Alston – Photography
 Cornelio Austin – Composer
 Babyface – Composer, Producer, background vocals (Track 7, 8)
 Gerald Baillergeau – Producer
 Rory Bennett – Composer, Producer
 Jack Benson – Producer
 Big Yam – Composer
 Blacq – Producer
 Steven Carty – Photography
 Alex Coletti – Producer
 Deyon Dobson – Composer, producer
 Kevin Edmonds – Lead and background vocals (Track 7)
 Melvin Edmonds – Lead and background vocals (Track 7)
 Joey Elias – Composer, producer
 Drew FitzGerald – Design
 Richard Griffin – Composer
 Cedric "K-Ci" Hailey – Composer
 Joel "JoJo" Hailey – Composer, producer
 Roy Hamilton – Producer
 C. Hampton – Composer
 James Harris – Composer
 Jimmy Jam – Producer
 R. Kelly – Composer
 Barry Korkin – Editorial assistant
 Erick Labson – Mastering
 Terry Lewis – Composer, Producer
 Lee Lodyga – Editorial Assistant
 Benny Medina – Producer
 Victor Merrit – Producer
 Brian Stokes Mitchell – Composer
 James Mtume – Producer
 Amy Neiman – Photo Research
 Ryan Null – Photo Coordination
 Emanuel Officer – Composer, Producer
 Tim Owens – Composer, Producer
 Mike Ragogna – Compilation Producer
 Teddy Riley – Producer
 John "4 Daddman" Robinson – Producer
 Jon-John Robinson – Composer
 Ralph Stacey – Producer
 Shannon Steckloff – Production Coordination
 Gloria Stewart – Composer
 Laney Stewart – Composer, Producer
 Kevin Westenberg – Photography
 Joseph Wikes – Liner Notes
 Bobby Womack – Composer
 James "Big Jim" Wright – Composer

Charts

References

External links 
 

2005 greatest hits albums
K-Ci & JoJo albums